= Aysor =

Aysor (in Armenian Այսօր) was an Armenian language publication in Paris, France that was established in 1950 under the editorship of Hovhannes Boghosian and Shavarsh Sevhonkian. Aysor means "today" in Armenian. The paper was published from a printing house that carried the same name. It ceased publication in 1954 after reservations by the French authorities about its politics.
